Moustoir-Remungol is a former commune in the Morbihan department of Brittany in north-western France.

History 
On 1 January 2016, Moustoir-Remungol, Naizin and Remungol merged becoming one commune called Évellys.

Demographics
Inhabitants of Moustoir-Remungol are called in French Moustoiriens.

See also
Communes of the Morbihan department

References

Former communes of Morbihan